"The Night" is the debut single by the Italian singer Valerie Dore. It was a commercial success primarily in Europe.

The song is a mellow midtempo disco song about unrequited love, and its meaning is emphasized by the melancholy sound.

The song was remixed in 1992 by Oliver Momm for the compilation The Best of Valerie Dore on ZYX Records.

The song was sampled by Play Paul in his song called "Spaced Out 2".

Cover versions of "The Night" were released by Spanish singer Princessa in 1997, German band Scooter, and DJ Tonka.

Track listing 

 Italian 12" single

 "The Night (Vocal Version)" – 5:46
 "The Night (Instrumental Version)" – 5:39

 Italian 7" single

 "The Night" – 4:00
 "	The Night (Instrumental)" – 5:39

 German 12" single

 "The Night (Special Remix)" – 6:45
 "The Night (Instrumental)" – 5:39

Charts

References

External links 

 

1984 songs
1984 singles
Valerie Dore songs
ZYX Music singles